Hester Henriette Grové(née Venter) (September 26, 1922 -  December 15, 2009) was a South African writer of African origin. She was married to the literary critic A.P. Grové.

She is best known for her short stories and her plays. She is one of the few writers to have won the Hertzog Prize in multiple categories. Radiodramas are Die Glasdeur and Die Goeie Jaar. A drama Die Bokamer . A short story is Swart Haan, collected in for instance "Moderne Afrikaanse Verhaalkuns", byeengebring en toeglig deur Dr. F.E.F. Malherbe.

References

South African women writers
1922 births
2009 deaths
Hertzog Prize winners